Noonu may refer to:
Noonu, Estonia, a village in Vihula PArish, Lääne-Viru County, Estonia
Noonu Atoll, an administrative division of the Maldives
Noonu, a character of the Thaana script